Kathleen Collins (September 22, 1903 – September 24, 1994) was an American film actress of the silent era.

Selected filmography
 The Country Flapper (1922)
 Cyclone Jones (1923)
 Wolfheart's Revenge (1925)
 Black Cyclone (1925)
 Satan Town (1926)
 Daniel Boone Thru the Wilderness (1926)
 The Unknown Cavalier (1926)
 The Overland Stage (1927)
 Quarantined Rivals (1927)
 Somewhere in Sonora (1927)
 The Devil's Saddle (1927)
 Burning Bridges (1928)
 The Valley of Hunted Men (1928)
 Fangs of Fate (1928)
 Two Outlaws (1928)
 The Border Patrol (1928)
 Grit Wins (1929)
 The Ridin' Demon (1929)
 Border Devils (1932)

References

Bibliography
 Munden, Kenneth White. The American Film Institute Catalog of Motion Pictures Produced in the United States, Part 1. University of California Press, 1997.

External links

1903 births
1994 deaths
American film actresses
American silent film actresses
20th-century American actresses
Actresses from San Antonio